Tavarnelle Val di Pesa is a former comune (municipality) and since 2019 a frazione  of Barberino Tavarnelle in the Metropolitan City of Florence in the Italian region Tuscany.

Sights
The main attraction of the territory of Tavarnelle is the Badia di Passignano (Abbey of Passignano), a monastery existing from the High Middle Ages.

Other sights include:
Church of Santa Lucia al Borghetto, part of a Franciscan monastery known from 1260. The church is an example of Gothic architecture.
Gothic church of Madonna della Neve, with 14th-15th-century frescoes.
Church of Santa Maria del Carmine al Morrocco (15th century)
Sanctuary of Santa Maria delle Grazie a Pietracupa, founded in 1596, with a Madonna image frescoed by Paolo Schiavo.
Pieve of San Pietro in Bossolo, a Romanesque church known from 990, housing works from Roman, Byzantine and Florentine schools. 
Villa di Spoiano, renaissance villa between Tavarnelle Val di Pesa and Barberino Val d'Elsa
Villa di Poggio Petroio, outside the town.
The pieve of  San Donato in Poggio (12th century), in Romanesque style, with a basilica plan with a nave and two aisles and three apses. It houses a baptism shell by Giovanni della Robbia (1513) and a triptych by Giovanni del Biondo (1375). 
Bridge over the Pesa River in the frazione of Sambuca.

Tignano is a fortified hamlet whose church of San Romolo houses a terracotta tabernacle by Giovanni della Robbia.

References

External links
 Official website

Cities and towns in Tuscany
 
Frazioni of Barberino Tavarnelle
Former municipalities of Tuscany